Cilgwyn quarry is a slate quarry located on the north edge of the Nantlle Vale, in North Wales. It is one of the earliest slate quarries in Great Britain, being worked as early as the 12th century. King Edward I of England was reputed to have stayed in a house roofed by Cilgwyn slates, during the Welsh wars of independence. It is one of the major slate quarries in the Nantlle Valley area.

History 
Quarrying at Cilgwyn dates back to the 12th century. By the end of the 18th century a large number of small pits had grown into a substantial working.

The Cilgwyn Quarry Company was formed in 1800 by the Caernarfon solicitor John Evans. By the 1820s it had been taken over by the Cilgwyn and Cefn Du Slate Company, though this company collapsed in 1831. It was then taken over by George Alfred Muskett, a banker from St Albans who served as MP for that city from 1837 to 1841. Muskett's tenure was not successful, and by 1840 the quarry was failing. Many of the quarrymen went unpaid and they resorted to selling slates directly instead of through the company. Muskett fled the country in 1842, leaving behind debts of £10,000; he died in exile a year later.

Quarrying later resumed at Cilgwyn but it failed again between 1843 and 1844, closing with debts of around £20,000. Cilgwyn was operating again by the 1850s and developed four main pits.  In 1882, 7,430 tons of finished slate were produced. Between 1864 and 1895 between 200 and 304 workers were employed at Cilgwyn; this had dropped to 51 to 102 between 1918 and 1937. Quarrying continued at Cilgwyn until 1956.

In the early 2000s, the quarry was used as a waste dump by the local council, but landfill activity ceased in January 2009.

Description 
Cilgwyn was an opencast quarry comprising three main pits: Gloddfa Glitiau to the north-east, Old Cilgwyn to the west and Veingoch to the south-east. Earlier in its history there were a larger number of smaller pits. The mills stood on top of significant waste tips to the south and east of the pits. A tramway north ran from the mills to another waste tipping site to the north of the quarry at Bryn Byfryd Terrace.

Transportation 

Cilgwyn quarry was connected to the  gauge Nantlle Railway by a pair of inclines that dropped from the Cilgwyn mill level through Glantyfedw quarry to a junction at Talysarn Uchaf. Internally the quarry had an extensive network of  gauge tramways. These served the three main pits and the waste tips. A mile-long tramway ran from the mills round a horseshoe curve to a waste tip on the north side of Mynydd y Cilgwyn. In 1923 a connection was made from this tramway to the line connecting Fron quarry to Bryngywn. This allowed slates to be dispatched from Cilgwyn onto the Welsh Highland Railway, avoiding the need to transship slates from the internal quarry wagons into the Nantlle Railway's wagons.

The quarry used at least three steam locomotives internally from 1876: Queenie a Bagnall, Lilla a large quarry Hunslet and Jubilee 1897 built by Manning Wardle. Lilia and Jubilee 1897 were sold in 1928 for use on the Penrhyn Quarry Railway and both survived into preservation - Lilla on the Ffestiniog Railway and Jubilee 1897 at the Narrow Gauge Railway Museum. The steam locomotives were replaced with a number of diesels. One of these - Ruston & Hornsby works number 175414 of 1936 - survives in preservation at the Welsh Slate Museum in Llanberis where it carries the name Cilgwyn; it worked at Cilgwyn quarry between 1936 and 1940.

The quarry ceased to send slate via the Welsh Highland Railway in 1935 when a new road was constructed down to Talsarn.  From that point all slate left the quarry by road.

References 

Slate mines in Gwynedd
Dyffryn Nantlle